General elections were held in Ecuador on 17 February 2013 to elect the President, the National Assembly, Provincial Assemblies and members of the Andean Parliament. The incumbent President Rafael Correa was re-elected by a wide margin. Correa's closest electoral rival, Guillermo Lasso, conceded the election shortly after it concluded.

The vote had been set for January 2013, but was put back a month to allow a full year to elapse after the reform of election rules.

This was the first election since 1996 held after the natural expiration of a four-year presidential term. This was due to a decade of political and economical instability that Ecuador experienced after Abdalá Bucaram was impeached by the former Congress, in late 1997, and that lasted until Correa's inauguration in early 2007.

Background
The call for general elections happened on 18 October 2012. The election campaigns were officially launched on 4 January and ended on 14 February, as announced by CNE member Juan Pablo Pozo.

Voters chose the president and vice president of the Republic, as well as national and provincial assembly members, members of the Andean Parliament, mayors, prefects, and other sectional officials.

The seated President Correa, a two-term incumbent, is credited with bringing stability and prosperity to Ecuador's nearly 15 million people. A staunch friend of Venezuela's Hugo Chavez, he is usually described as "leftist" and "socialist." He is committed to poverty reduction through not just economic growth, but redistribution of wealth as well. As he told the CELAC Summit in 2015: 
"For the first time in the history of humanity this poverty is no longer due to a lack of resources, but rather is the fruit of inequality, and this, in turn, the product of perverse relations of power, where few have it all and many have nothing at all.”
This approach has generated fervent support as well as hostility from wealthy sectors in Ecuador; for example, his land reform policies for giving unproductive land to poor peasants has worried agribusiness, particularly the large flower and banana producers. He has vastly expanded the number of workers on the public sector and made health and education free for all Ecuadorians. Some have argued that Correa has clamped down on dissent in the country's news media, although journalists in Ecuador are not risking their lives as they are in other countries of the region. His government has run record-high deficits. In 2009, Correa became the first president of Ecuador to win re-election in nearly a half-century.

Democracy Code
In late 2012, Ecuador's Constitutional Court (CC) ruled on the adoption of the Democracy Code by a 6 to 3 vote in favor. The new resolution made the D'Hondt method of voting constitutional; therefore it was applied in the 2013 elections. The resolution also states that legal restrictions on the work of journalists during elections are unconstitutional.

Presidential elections

Candidates
Eight presidential candidates were registered in the National Electoral Council.  The candidates were: Rafael Correa of the PAIS Alliance movement, Guillermo Lasso of the Creating Opportunities movement, Lucio Gutiérrez of the PSP party, Alberto Acosta Espinoza, candidate of the Coordinating Committee of the Left, Norman Wray, of the Ruptura 25 movement, Nelson Zavala, of the Roldosist Party, Mauricio Rodas, of the SUMA movement, and Álvaro Noboa, of PRIAN.

Restrictions of the candidate's qualifications
The National Electoral Council (Spanish-language initials, CNE) approved the regulations for the registration and qualification of candidates running for President, Vice President, Assembly and the Andean Parliament for the election. The regulations established that candidates who have contracts with the State or have received final judgments for offenses penalized with imprisonment such as  bribery, illicit enrichment and embezzlement, would not be allowed to participate.

Parliamentary elections
Ecuadorians not only voted on February 17 for their president and vice-president, but as well as for 137 members of the national assembly; drawn from provinces, a national list, and six migrant spots, and for their five Andean Parliament representatives.

Opinion polls
Surveys generally attributed between 50% and 60% of the votes to President Correa. The seven other candidates lagged far behind; Correa's nearest rival, Guillermo Lasso, was credited with 10—20% of the vote.

Results

President

National Assembly

Andean Parliament

Reactions
Banker Guillermo Lasso, the runner-up in the vote, conceded his defeat in broad terms, by stating: “I recognise the triumph of President Correa.” Thousands of Correa's backers celebrated in Quito's main square just after the polls closed. Speaking from the balcony of the Presidential Palace, Correa thanked them for their "immense trust.”

References

Presidential elections in Ecuador
Elections in Ecuador
2013 in Ecuador
Ecuador
Election and referendum articles with incomplete results